Xieleqiao Town is an urban town in Ningxiang County, Changsha City, Hunan Province, China. It is surrounded by Huitang Town and Fengmuqiao Township on the west, Shuangfupu Town on the north, Zifu on the east, and Jinsou Township on the south. Fengmuqiao township and Xieleqiao town merged to Huitang town on November 19, 2015.

Administrative division
The Town is divided into nine villages and one community: Xieleqiao Community, Shuinan Village, Fujian Village, Kangning Village, Bashi Village, Shuangpen Village, Zhutian Village, Fenhua Village, Jiangjun Village and Jinong Village.

Geography
Wu River, a tributary of the Wei River, it flows through the town.

Economy
Tea, Citrus and prunus mume are important to the economy.

Education
There are two junior high schools and six primary schools located with the town.

Culture
Huaguxi is the most influence local theater.

References

Historic towns and townships of Ningxiang